

Professor Dines Bjørner (born 4 October 1937, in Odense) is a Danish computer scientist.

He specializes in research into domain engineering, requirements engineering and formal methods. He worked with Cliff Jones and others on the Vienna Development Method (VDM) at IBM Laboratory Vienna (and elsewhere). Later he was involved with producing the RAISE (Rigorous Approach to Industrial Software Engineering) formal method with tool support.

Bjørner was a professor at the Technical University of Denmark (DTU) from 1965–1969 and 1976–2007, before he retired in March 2007. He was responsible for establishing the United Nations University International Institute for Software Technology (UNU-IIST), Macau, in 1992 and was its first director. His magnum opus on software engineering (three volumes) appeared in 2005/6.

To support VDM, Bjørner co-founded VDM-Europe, which subsequently became Formal Methods Europe, an organization that supports conferences and related activities. In 2003, he instigated the associated ForTIA Formal Techniques Industry Association.

Bjørner became a knight of the Order of the Dannebrog in 1985. He received a Dr.h.c. from the Masaryk University, Brno, Czech Republic in 2004. In 2021, he obtained a Dr. techn. from the Technical University of Denmark, Kongens Lyngby, Denmark. He is a Fellow of the IEEE (2004) and ACM (2005). He has also been a member of the Academia Europaea since 1989.

In 2007, a Symposium was held in Macau in honour of Dines Bjørner and Zhou Chaochen. In 2021, Bjørner was elected to a Formal Methods Europe (FME) Fellowship.

Bjørner is married to Kari Bjørner, with two children and five grandchildren.

Selected books
 Domain Science and Engineering: A Foundation for Software Development, Bjørner, D. Monographs in Theoretical Computer Science, An EATCS Series, Springer Nature. Hardcover ; softcover ; eBook  (2021).
 Software Engineering 1: Abstraction and Modelling, Bjørner, D. Texts in Theoretical Computer Science, An EATCS Series, Springer-Verlag.  (2005).
 Software Engineering 2: Specification of Systems and Languages, Bjørner, D. Texts in Theoretical Computer Science, An EATCS Series, Springer-Verlag.  (2006).
 Software Engineering 3: Domains, Requirements, and Software Design, Bjørner, D. Texts in Theoretical Computer Science, An EATCS Series, Springer-Verlag.  (2006).
 Formal Specification and Software Development, Bjørner, D. and Jones, C.B. Prentice Hall International Series in Computer Science, Prentice Hall.  (1982).
 The Vienna Development Method: The Meta-Language, Bjørner, D. and Jones, C.B. (editors). Lecture Notes in Computer Science, Volume 61, Springer-Verlag.  (1978).

See also
 International Journal of Software and Informatics

References

External links
 Home page
 Biographical information
 RAISE information
 
 

1937 births
Living people
People from Odense
Technical University of Denmark alumni
Danish computer scientists
IBM employees
Academic staff of the Technical University of Denmark
Academic staff of United Nations University
Formal methods people
Computer science writers
Knights of the Order of the Dannebrog
Fellow Members of the IEEE
Fellows of the Association for Computing Machinery
Members of Academia Europaea